Here is the following list of the modern equipment in the Georgian Defence Forces:

Small arms

Pistols

Shotguns

Submachine guns

Carbines

Assault rifles

Sniper rifles

Anti-material rifles

Machine guns

Grenade launchers

Grenades

Anti-personnel mines

Anti armor systems

Anti-tank mines

Anti-armour grenade launcher

Anti-tank missile systems

Mortars

Vehicles

Armored vehicles

Unarmoured vehicles

Artillery

Air-defense

Anti-aircraft arillery

Man-portable air-defense systems

Missile systems

Radars

Aircraft

Aircraft armament

Uniforms

Personal equipment

Other equipment

References

Georgian Army
Military equipment of Georgia (country)